Rickson van Hees (born June 21, 2002) is an American soccer player.

Career

Youth
Van Hees played with local side SC Del Sol before moving to the Netherlands to join Vitesse in November 2015. He moved to NEC Nijmegen in 2018, going on to sign a professional contract with the club in 2019.

Professional
On April 20, 2021, van Hees returned to the United States to join USL League One side North Texas SC. He made his debut on May 29, 2021, starting against Toronto FC II. On August 12, 2021, van Hees and North Texas mutually agreed to part ways.

Personal
Van Hees was born in Glendale, Arizona to a Dutch father and Mexican mother.

References 

2002 births
American sportspeople of Mexican descent
American people of Dutch descent
American people of Mexican descent
American soccer players
Association football defenders
Living people
NEC Nijmegen players
North Texas SC players
People from Glendale, Arizona
Soccer players from Arizona
Sportspeople from Glendale, Arizona
United States men's youth international soccer players
USL League One players